Édgar Sosa may refer to:

Édgar Sosa (basketball) (born 1988), Dominican basketball player
Édgar Sosa (boxer) (born 1979), Mexican boxer